Perfect Storm: Disasters That Changed The World is a Canadian Historical Documentary which was broadcast on History and Yesterday. The series travelled around the world and through the ages to investigate the biggest and the most catastrophic storms of all time.

Episode list

References

External links
 

2010s Canadian documentary television series
2013 Canadian television series debuts
2013 Canadian television series endings